The 1959–60 FA Cup was the 79th staging of the world's oldest football cup competition, the Football Association Challenge Cup, commonly known as the FA Cup. Wolverhampton Wanderers won the competition for the fourth time, beating Blackburn Rovers 3–0 in the final at Wembley.

Matches were scheduled to be played at the stadium of the team named first on the date specified for each round, which was always a Saturday. Some matches, however, might be rescheduled for other days if there were clashes with games for other competitions or the weather was inclement. If scores were level after 90 minutes had been played, a replay would take place at the stadium of the second-named team later the same week. If the replayed match was drawn further replays would be held until a winner was determined. If scores were level after 90 minutes had been played in a replay, a 30-minute period of extra time would be played.

Calendar

First round proper

At this stage clubs from the Football League Third and Fourth Divisions joined those 30 non-league clubs having come through the qualifying rounds. Crook Town and Barnet also given byes to this round. Matches were scheduled to be played on Saturday, 14 November 1959. Ten were drawn and went to replays, played on 17–19 November.

Second round proper
The matches were scheduled for Saturday, 5 December 1959, with three matches taking place later. Five matches were drawn, with replays taking place later the same week.

Third round proper
The 44 First and Second Division clubs entered the competition at this stage. The matches were scheduled for Saturday, 9 January 1960. Eight matches were drawn and went to replays, with the Rotherham United–Arsenal match requiring a second replay.

Fourth round proper
The matches were scheduled for Saturday, 30 January 1960. Six matches were drawn and went to replays, which were all played in the following midweek match. For the second round in a row, Rotherham United were held to a second replay, this time against Brighton & Hove Albion.

Fifth Round Proper
The matches were scheduled for Saturday, 20 February 1960. One match went to a replay in the following mid-week fixture.

Sixth Round Proper
The draw for the semi-finals was made on Monday, 22 February 1960. All the original matches were played on Saturday, 12 March 1960.

Replay

Semi-finals
The draw for the semi-finals was made on Monday, 14 March 1960. Both matches were played on Saturday, 26 March 1960.

Final

References
General
The FA Cup Archive at TheFA.com

Specific

 
FA Cup seasons